Amado Pérez (born 24 June 1959) is a Paraguayan footballer. He played in four matches for the Paraguay national football team in 1979. He was also part of Paraguay's squad for the 1979 Copa América tournament.

References

1959 births
Living people
Paraguayan footballers
Paraguay international footballers
Place of birth missing (living people)
Association football midfielders
Club Sol de América footballers
Club Atlético Vélez Sarsfield footballers
Club León footballers
Cerro Porteño players
Paraguayan expatriate footballers
Expatriate footballers in Mexico
Expatriate footballers in Argentina